The Merchant Square Footbridge (also known as The Fan Bridge) is a moveable pedestrian bridge spanning a canal in Paddington, London. It is architecturally and mechanically unique, being composed of five side-by side sections of varying lengths, with offset pivots to accommodate the varying lengths. When opened, the segments are brought to varying angles of elevation. The visual effect when opened has been likened to that of a Japanese fan.

Not to be confused with the Fan Bridge which crosses Holland Brook (formerly known as the Holland River) between Little Clacton and Great Holland in Essex (UK) (OS Grid Ref: TM 19710 18667 / Latitude 51°49'24"N Longitude 1°11'12"E). This was the lowest crossing-point until the Gunfleet estuary was reclaimed in the 1700s.

See also 
 List of bridges in London
 Moveable bridges for a list of other moveable bridge types
 The Rolling Bridge

References

External links
 Architecture Daily Website

Bascule bridges
Bridges completed in 2014
Buildings and structures in the City of Westminster
Paddington
Pedestrian bridges in London